The following is a list of aircraft of the Hellenic Air Force.

Aircraft

Weapons inventory

Anti-aircraft systems

Anti-ship missiles:
 Exocet AM-39 Block II
 Harpoon Block II

Air-to-air missiles:
 AIM-9J Sidewinder
 AIM-9L/I Sidewinder
 AIM-9L/I1 Sidewinder
 AIM-9M Sidewinder
 AIM-9P4 Sidewinder
 AIM-120B AMRAAM
 AIM-120C-5/7 AMRAAM
 IRIS-T
 Meteor
 MICA EM
 MICA IIR
 R.550 MAGIC-II

Air-to-ground missiles:
 AFDS (Autonomous Free-flight Dispenser System)
 AGM-65A/B
 AGM-65G2
 AGM-88 HARM
 AGM-88E AARGM
 AGM-154 JSOW
 BLU-109/B
 CBU 58 cluster bombs
 CBU 71 cluster bombs
 GBU-8Α/Β HOBOS
 GBU-10 Paveway (PW) II
 GBU-12 Paveway (PW) II 
 GBU-16 Paveway (PW) II
 GBU-24 Paveway (PW) III
 GBU-27 Paveway (PW) III
 GBU-31 JDAM
 GBU-50 EP II
 Μ-117 General Purpose (GP) 750 lbs
 Μ-129 Leaflet 250 lb
 Mk-20 ROCKEYE
 Mk 36 Destructor
 Mk-81 General Purpose (GP) Bomb
 Mk-82 500lb/Mk-15 Snakeye
 Mk-82 General Purpose (GP) Bomb
 Mk-83 General Purpose (GP) Bomb
 Mk-84 General Purpose (GP) Bomb
 SCALP EG (Storm Shadow)

Targeting and navigation pods: 

 ASTAC ELINT-SIGINT
 DB-110
 LANTIRN-AWNP 
 LANTIRN-TP 
 LITENING targeting pod

See also

List of historic aircraft of the Hellenic Air Force
List of former equipment of the Hellenic Armed Forces

References

External links

Updated list of inventory (Greek)

Greece

Greek military-related lists